Kenneth John Kaiser (July 26, 1945 – August 8, 2017) was an American umpire in Major League Baseball who worked in the American League from 1977 to 1999. He spent 13 years in the minor leagues and 23 years in the major leagues, a total of 36 years in professional baseball. Kaiser wore uniform number 21 when the AL adopted numbers for umpires in 1980.

Umpiring career
Kaiser officiated in the World Series in 1987 and 1997, as well as the All-Star Game in 1991. He also umpired in the American League Championship Series in 1980, 1988, 1993 and 1995 (Game 6), and in the American League Division Series in 1981, 1996 and 1997. On May 6, 1982, he was home plate umpire for Gaylord Perry's 300th career victory.

Before reaching the major leagues, Kaiser worked as a professional wrestler, wearing a black hood and being known as "The Hatchet Man." In his brief stint as a professional wrestler, he wrestled such famous opponents as Haystacks Calhoun.

In 1986, Kaiser was voted the Most Colorful Umpire in the American League in a poll by The Sporting News. He was voted the worst umpire in the AL in a poll of players during 1999 spring training. Later that year, he was among the umpires who submitted their resignations in a failed gambit by the Major League Umpires Association, and he was not among those later re-hired following union negotiations and litigation.

Weight
Apart from the unlikelihood that he maintained that precise weight for fifteen years, there are ample reasons to believe that his weight topped  for much of that time. After McSherry's death, Gregg took a two-month leave of absence in which he lost  but was still listed at  the following year. In a June 2004 column for ESPN's MLB Insider, pitcher Tom Candiotti recalled that Kaiser "wouldn't move three steps to call a play." Candiotti's assessment of Kaiser was seconded by one of his American League colleagues, Durwood Merrill, who noted that Kaiser usually "marched to the beat of his own drummer" in his autobiography, You're Out and You're Ugly, Too.

Later years
Kaiser's 2003 autobiography, written with the help of author David Fisher, is entitled Planet of the Umps: A Baseball Life From Behind the Plate. Kaiser died from complications of diabetes almost two weeks after his 72nd birthday.

See also

 List of Major League Baseball umpires

References

Further reading

External links
Retrosheet

1945 births
2017 deaths
Deaths from diabetes
Major League Baseball umpires
Sportspeople from Rochester, New York